Syllepte consimilalis is a moth in the family Crambidae. It was described by Julius Lederer in 1863. It is found on Ambon Island and in Ternate in Indonesia.

References

Moths described in 1863
consimilalis
Moths of Indonesia